Retford Rail  F.C. was a football club based in Retford, Nottinghamshire. It competed in the Midland Football League, Northern Counties East League and Central Midlands League. In 1992 they merged with Eaton Hall College to form B.R.S.A. Retford in the Lincolnshire Football League.

References

Defunct football clubs in Nottinghamshire
Retford
Central Midlands Football League
Northern Counties East Football League
Midland Football League (1889)
Association football clubs disestablished in 1992
Railway association football teams in England